Walton-le-Dale is a large village in the South Ribble district of Lancashire, England.  In the area close to it are the settlements of Higher Walton, Walton Summit, Bamber Bridge, and Gregson Lane.  This area contains 34 buildings that are recorded in the National Heritage List for England as designated listed buildings.  Of these, six are listed at Grade II*, the middle grade, and the others are at Grade II, the lowest grade.  The area is partly residential and partly rural.  Its listed buildings include churches and associated structures, houses, farmhouses and farm buildings, public houses, and a war memorial.


Key

Buildings

Notes and references

Notes

Citations

Sources

Lists of listed buildings in Lancashire
Buildings and structures in South Ribble